Xishui may refer to several places in China:

Xishui County, Guizhou (习水县), county of Zunyi, Guizhou
Xishui County, Hubei, county of Huanggang, Hubei